This is a list of Georgian football transfers summer 22.

Erovnuli Liga

Dinamo Batumi

In:

Out:

Dinamo Tbilisi

In:

Out:

Dila Gori

In:
 

Out:

Gagra

In:

Out:

Locomotive Tbilisi

In:

Out:

Saburtalo Tbilisi

In:

Out:

Samgurali Tsqaltubo

In:

Out:

Samtredia

In:

Out:

Shukura Kobuleti

In:

Out:

Sioni Bolnisi

In:

Out:

Telavi

In:

Out:

Torpedo Kutaisi

In:

Out:

Erovnuli Liga 2

Shevardeni-1906

In:

Out:

References

External links

Georgian
Transfers
2022